Namangana was a genus of moths of the family Noctuidae. It is now considered a synonym of Hecatera. It consisted of the species Namangana mirabilis, which has been renamed to Hecatera mirabilis.

References
Natural History Museum Lepidoptera genus database

Hadeninae